SpongeBob SquarePants 4D: The Great Jelly Rescue (often referred to as SpongeBob SquarePants 4D or simply The Great Jelly Rescue) is a 4-D film attraction and successor to SpongeBob SquarePants 4-D. It follows SpongeBob, Patrick, and Sandy as they rescue the jellyfish of Jellyfish Fields from Plankton's evil clutches.

Plot
The ride begins with the French narrator telling the audience to put away any recording devices, and that SpongeBob will be their tour guide through Jellyfish Fields. The audience then "dives" underwater in a submarine, hitting an anchor in the process. The submarine arrives in Jellyfish Fields, where SpongeBob and Patrick sing "The Jellyfishing Song," from SpongeBob's Last Stand," while catching jellyfish. Sandy then shows up with her net launcher to catch the jellyfish. SpongeBob notices that the jellyfish have disappeared, and a huge swarm of them attack the trio, launching them into the air.

The jellyfish get sucked inside a large truck, and SpongeBob discovers that the truck driver is Plankton. The trio chase after the truck, as it launches itself into the air. Plankton then shoves his face against the audience and tells them that he plans to drain the jellyfish of their electricity and use it to destroy The Krusty Krab. He then uses an electrified-cannon to electrocute the trio and leaves.

After SpongeBob, Patrick, and Sandy recover from the electricity, the Flying Dutchman arrives in his ghost ship, and blames them for the soot that Plankton's truck is producing. The Dutchman pulls SpongeBob, Patrick, and Sandy into his ship, and sentences them to the "Perfume Department," and get perfume sprayed onto them (a reference to Shanghaied). Unaffected by the perfume, Sandy explains to the Dutchman that Plankton is responsible and the Flying Dutchman takes the trio into the cannon room to stop him. Patrick looks through a telescope to see Plankton zapping The Krusty Krab.

The Flying Dutchman launches a cannonball with Patrick's net, realizing that it's attached to his leg. SpongeBob and Sandy hold onto him while launching, and they land at SpongeBob's house. The trio then gets pulled into downtown Bikini Bottom and The Krusty Krab, crashing into Plankton's truck, destroying it, and freeing all of the jellyfish. Before Plankton can flee, a jellyfish shoots him with Sandy's net launcher, defeating him. Sandy then finds out that SpongeBob has absorbed the soot into his body, then he releases it. Mr. Krabs tells SpongeBob that his break is over, and goes back inside The Krusty Krab. SpongeBob, Patrick, and Sandy all say goodbye to the audience as they sing "The Jellyfishing Song," and the submarine leaves the ocean floor.

Characters 

 Tom Kenny as SpongeBob SquarePants and the French narrator
 Bill Fagerbakke as Patrick Star
 Carolyn Lawrence as Sandy Cheeks
 Mr. Lawrence as Plankton
 Bob Joles as Mr. Krabs
 Brian Doyle-Murray as the Flying Dutchman

References

External links
 
 https://www.mos.org/4d/spongebob Attraction information for the Museum of Science (Boston)

SpongeBob SquarePants
4D films
2013 establishments in Florida
2014 establishments in New York (state)
2016 disestablishments in Florida
Amusement rides introduced in 2013
Amusement rides that closed in 2016